Ansar Shah (also known Ansar Sha) is an Indian cinematographer, who works predominantly in the Hindi and Malayalam cinema industries.  He is a graduate of the Film and Television Institute of India, Pune.

Early life
Shah attended school at MMHS, Nilamel, and graduated with a BSC in Physics from the University of Kerala in  2003. He completed post-grad studies in Journalism at the  Institute of Journalism  in 2004; and Linguistics at the University of Kerala in 2006

Career
Shah started his career assisting established cinematographers such as Rajeev Ravi, Satyajit Pande, Kavin Jagtiani, Suresh Rajan and Rafey Mehmood in movies and commercials.  He debuted in the Malayalam movie industry with Ishq in 2019.  That was followed by work on Moonwalk, Liquor Island, and Jo and Jo.  His initial venture in Bollywood was Aap ke padose Mein.

He received the 2016 Kerala State Television "Award for Best Cinematography" for the movie short, Chaver.

Filmography

References

External links 
 

Malayalam film cinematographers
1983 births
Living people
People from Kollam district
Cinematographers from Kerala